Caras may refer to:

 Caras (magazine), a Portugal-based women's magazine
 Caraș River, a river in Servia and Romania
 Caras (tribe), an indigenous tribe living in coastal Ecuador (1-1000 CE)
 Carás, an alternate spelling of Caraz (mountain), in the Peruvian Andes
 Canadian Academy of Recording Arts and Sciences, an organization for promoting and celebrating Canadian music and artists and which conducts the Juno Awards

People with the surname Caras
 Cien Caras (born 1949), ring name of Mexican professional wrestler Carmelo Reyes González
 Dos Caras (born 1951), ring name of Mexican professional wrestler José Luis Rodríguez
 Dos Caras, Jr. (born 1977), ring name of Rodríguez's son, Mexican professional wrestler and mixed martial arts fighter Alberto Rodríguez, also known as Alberto Del Rio
 Emil Caras (born 1967), Moldovan association football coach and a former player
 Ion Caras (born 1950), Moldovan association football manager
 Peter Caras (born 1941), American illustrator
 Roger A. Caras (1928–2001), American animal photographer/writer and wildlife preservationist

See also
Caris (disambiguation)
Karas (disambiguation)

bg:Карас
ru:Карас